Pattam Pole (English: Like a Kite) is a 2013 Malayalam romantic film directed by cinematographer Alagappan N, who makes his directorial debut. The film stars Dulquer Salmaan and Malavika Mohanan with Archana Kavi, Anoop Menon, Lalu Alex, Jayaprakash, Seetha, Leema Babu, Shraddha Gokul, Nandhu and Ilavarasu play supporting roles.

Plot
Karthi- a Tamil Hindu Brahmin boy and Riya- a Christian girl elope one early morning to Ooty, fearing that the elders in the family will not accept their inter-religious relationship and a relationship of different castes. They return to their respective homes a couple of days after fighting. They convince their family members that they hate each other and vow never to see each other again. But their fathers plan to reunite them thinking that they have broken due to immatureness and ego problems. Riya's father is a friend of Karthi's father. Riya's family [without Riya] visit Karthi's home and invite them to Riya's marriage.

Meanwhile, both Riya and Karthi join the same company to work. Due to losses in the company caused by Riya, she is expelled from her job.  Soon after Karthi meet Riya and they express love for each other and decide to elope in a houseboat. However, they are caught by their fathers. Karthi's father hands them a marriage invitation which reads " RIYA and KARTHIK". The movie ends as they both thank and hug their fathers. The film ends as they walk through their home happily.

Cast

Dulquer Salmaan as Karthikeyan 
Malavika Mohanan as Riya
Archana Kavi as Sherin Varghese
Anoop Menon as Michael Rossario
Jayaprakash as Narayana Swami, Karthik's father
Lalu Alex as Mathews, Riya's father
Meera Krishnan as Anandam, Karthik's mother
Seetha as Sussan Mathews, Riya's mother
Leema Babu as Varalakshmi, Karthik's cousin
 Sunil Sukhada as Avira
Shraddha Gokul as Rita, Riya's sister
Kannan Nayar as Ronex, Sherin's fiancée
Nandhu as Father Joy
Ilavarasu as Karthik's uncle
Ziyam Hasbi as Rinu
Anjali Aneesh Upasana
Manjusha Sajish as a Bride travelling in bus

Production
The film marks the directorial debut of veteran cinematographer Alagappan. The story has been nurtured by Alagappan for two and a half years. His story and idea found many takers and veteran producer Carlton Karunakaran readily agreed to produce the film. But Alagappan wanted to finish all his projects for other filmmakers before he donned the director's cap. In the meantime, he tightened his script and penned the dialogues in Tamil while Gireesh Kumar who wrote the scripts took care of the parts in Malayalam.

The film commenced its production in June 2013 in Kumbakonam in Tamil Nadu. The major location was Alappuzha in Kerala where the film is mostly set.

Critical reception
The film received negative reviews from critics. Paresh C Palicha of Rediff.com rated the film 2/5 and said, "Alagappan has tried to serve old wine in a 'new generation' bottle in his first film as director, and the end result is just average." The critic however felt that the film "is unconventionally bold with the way it deals with the issue of live-in relationship." Ramesh Chandran of Malayala Manorama rated the film 1 in a scale of 5 and stated that the director has failed to impress the audience in his directorial debut. The critic concluded his review saying, "The movie has no spark. It does not offer you anything new or something old in a better way." Aswin J. Kumar of The Times of India wrote: "Romance, no matter how many times it's told, has a special lure that diminishes the cliches that accompany it. In this film, this never happens." Veeyen of Nowrunning.com rated the film 2/5 and said, "Azhagappan's directorial debut 'Pattam Pole' is a kite that takes to the winds with a vengeance, having severed its ties off its flyer. It flies aimlessly this way and that before losing poise and crashing to the ground, all torn and tattered.".

Soundtrack

The film features songs composed by M. Jayachandran and written by Santhosh Verma and Annamalai (Antha Naalil song).Label registered as Satyam Audios

References

External links
 

Films shot in Tamil Nadu
2013 films
2010s Malayalam-language films
Indian romantic comedy films
2013 romantic comedy films
Films shot in Alappuzha
2013 directorial debut films
Films scored by M. Jayachandran